Savannah Broadus and Abigail Forbes were the defending champions, but were no longer eligible to participate in junior tournaments.

Kristina Dmitruk and Diana Shnaider won the title, defeating Sofia Costoulas and Laura Hietaranta in the final, 6–1, 6–2.

Seeds

Draw

Finals

Top half

Bottom half

References

External links 
 Draw

Girls' Doubles
Wimbledon Championship by year – Girls' doubles